The Music Summit was a channel on XM Satellite Radio located on channel 13 (previously 24). The channel was programmed out of Cincinnati, Ohio, and sold to advertisers by Premiere Radio Networks. The terrestrial version is still free to air for HD Radio listeners on HD2 or HD3 stations owned by Clear Channel Communications in select radio markets.

The channel was pulled on June 8, 2011, in favor of a simulcast of WLTW in New York City.

History

Lite (2001–2002)
As part of an investment deal with Clear Channel Communications, XM agreed to simulcast some of Clear Channel's FM radio stations. Lite was one of the original four channels (named after Lite FM), and it simulcasted WLTW from New York City. With its popular adult contemporary format, WLTW has been the most profitable FM radio station in the US in recent years. Due to low subscription count at the time, XM's audience didn't concern themselves with the New York City locality of the station. After a couple years on the air, XM decided to move away from local simulcasts, and Lite became an exclusive-to-satellite station. However, the name Lite didn't stay.

Sunny (2002-2008)

On August 26, 2002, the Lite FM simulcast was dropped and the channel became its own brand: Sunny. The station was now on autopilot 24/7 with no jocks. In February 2003 Sunny joined all XM music channels in going commercial-free, making the station auto-piloted 24/7 by music. This incarnation of XM's Sunny had a beautiful music format and was programmed by Marlin Taylor. (In response to Lite FM's demise on XM, XM launched The Blend, a commercial-free mainstream adult contemporary channel on February 2, 2004.) From 2002 to 2004, Sunny featured a format of nonstop Christmas music between Thanksgiving and Christmas each year.

In March 2006, according to a 10-k filing, XM Satellite Radio mentioned that its Clear Channel-run music channels, including Sunny, would begin carrying commercials. This has been done to fulfill an arbitration settlement between XM and Clear Channel. In response to this, XM Canada, DirecTV and AOL Radio removed this channel on April 17 in favor of XM's commercial-free equivalent. Sunny now displays a "cm" next to its name on the XM unit's program-associated data to indicate that it is a commercial radio station. (As of May 5, the artist and song title is now displayed.)

Various format switches
On May 1, 2006, Sunny switched over to an adult standards style format, featuring more vocals and contemporary hits. A mix of big band hits and orchestral favorites, easy hits from the 1970s, oldies, some smooth jazz, and pop vocal standards figured in this nostalgic format. Concurrently, Escape on XM 78 replaced Sunny as the new "beautiful music" channel on XM.

On June 5 of the same year, Sunny changed formats yet again. It was now "AM gold" and classic hits, with no more hit parade songs, orchestral instrumentals or smooth jazz vocals, but instead strictly soft pop hits from the 1960s through the 1980s.  From November 19, 2006 to December 26, 2006, Sunny switched to a "holiday hits" format consisting of nonstop Christmas songs. Sunny was programmed in this period by Kevin Kash of DC101, until he was hired by XM to program hard-rock channel The Boneyard.

On 2007-07-27, Sunny 24 made musical adjustments to become more of a pop 1970s and 1980s formatted channel, which included more Rod Stewart, Billy Joel, Genesis, etc.  Musically the adjustments accommodated a slightly deeper library of hits.

By May 2008, Sunny 24 was nearly equivalent to XM25's "The Blend", as many 1980s songs were added, and very few "AM Radio Hits of the '60s and '70s" remained.

The end of Sunny
After several format attempts, Clear Channel finally dropped the Sunny name on XM 24. It was discovered that the channel would soon become "The Pink Channel," or simply "Pink." There was never any official announcement before the channel launched.

The Pink Channel (2008-2010)
The Pink Channel launched on XM Radio on August 18, 2008 at midnight eastern time, as a partnership between Premiere Radio and City of Hope National Medical Center. The channel is dedicated to aiding the cause of fighting and finding a cure for cancer, as the color pink is associated with the cause. Along with the launch came a brand new website, Pink Channel Radio.com. The first song heard on the channel was Listen to the Music by the Doobie Brothers.

Premiere Radio Networks officially announced the launching of the channel on August 18, 2008. The channel had a partnership between the Clear Channel subsidiary, and the City of Hope medical center in the Los Angeles area, specifically Duarte, CA to promote Cancer awareness and well being for just over a year.

On March 9, 2009, the Pink Channel revised their playlist by dropping songs from earlier decades in favor of a smaller selection of current hits. The channel positions itself as "All Hit Radio", playing only current hits (excluding recurrent and gold songs) from the Hot Adult Contemporary format; classifying the channel as contemporary hit radio.

On March 23, 2010, the Pink Channel changed its format to an adult album alternative playlist designed primarily for white females 18-45 and males 24-37. Key artists include: Annie Lennox, Indigo Girls, Sheryl Crow, KT Tunstall, Jack Johnson, Norah Jones, Chris Isaak, U2, R.E.M, Goo Goo Dolls, 10,000 Maniacs, Dave Matthews, Bob Marley, John Mayer and more.

As of August 2010, the channel has removed all Pink related packaging and elements, and is now identifying itself as both "The Music Summit" and "The Summit" through short voiceovers, but the XM website and receivers continue to label it as The Pink Channel. It's retaining the same music format.

The Music Summit (2010-11)
In late August/early September 2010, The Music Summit branding took place, retaining the same format as the Pink Channel.  XM receivers now display "Music Summit cm" and the XM website now reflects the name change.

On June 8, 2011, the WLTW simulcast returned to this channel.

Shows
 The Ian Whitcomb Show - An hour-long eclectic music show Sunday mornings. Hosted by musician Ian Whitcomb and produced by Premiere Satellite Radio.

References

XM Satellite Radio channels
Digital-only radio stations
Radio stations established in 2008
Radio stations disestablished in 2011
IHeartMedia radio stations
Defunct_radio_stations_in_the_United_States